The 22645/22646 Ahilya nagari Express is a weekly Superfast train of the Indian Railways, running between Indore in Madhya Pradesh and Kochuveli in Kerala (via Chennai Central). From February 2021, the terminal was changed to Kochuveli instead of Thiruvananthapuram Central. It runs between Kochuveli and Indore via Chennai Central

The name Ahilyanagari signifies the former name of the city of the Devi Ahilyabai Holkar, that is, Indore. Previously, it was running between Cochin Harbour Terminus and Indore, and later it was extended to Thiruvananthapuram. In the February of 2021, its terminal was changed to Kochuveli near Thiruvananthapuram Central

Service 

The 22645 Ahilyanagari Express has an average speed of 56 km/hr and covers 2645 km in 47 hours and 5 minutes.

The 22646 Ahilyanagari Express has an average speed of 57 km/hr and covers 2645 km in 46 hours 30 minutes.

Route and halts 

The important halts of the train are:

 
 
 
 
 
 
 
 
 
 
 
 
 
 
 
 
 
 
  (22646 Ahilyanagari Express does not halt here)

Schedule

Rake sharing 

The train shares its rake with the following trains:

 22647/48 Kochuveli–Korba Express Superfast Express
 12643/44 Thiruvanthapuram Central-Hazrat Nizamuddin Swarna Jayanti Supefast Express

Direction reversal 

The train reverses its direction 2 times at:

Traction 

As the route is completely electrified, an Erode (EDDS) or Royapuram (RPM)-based WAP-1/WAP-4/WAP-7 powers the train the entire journey.

Coach composition

The train consists of 21 coaches as follows:
 1 AC II Tier coach
 7 AC III Tier coaches
 9 Sleeper class coaches
 2 General Unreserved coaches
 2 Seating cum Luggage Rakes

See also

 Kochuveli–Indore Weekly Express

Notes

References

Transport in Indore
Transport in Thiruvananthapuram
Express trains in India
Rail transport in Madhya Pradesh
Rail transport in Kerala
Rail transport in Maharashtra
Rail transport in Telangana
Rail transport in Andhra Pradesh
Rail transport in Tamil Nadu
Named passenger trains of India